Duilio Beretta Avalos (born February 25, 1992) is a Peruvian professional tennis player.

He won the finals stage of Boys' Doubles events on the French Open and US Open with Ecuadorian tennis player Roberto Quiroz in 2010. They defeated Argentinian pair Facundo Argüello and Agustín Velotti in France and won against Oliver Golding and Jiří Veselý in the United States.

ATP Challenger and ITF Futures finals

Singles: 8 (2–6)

Doubles: 26 (18–8)

Junior Grand Slam finals

Doubles: 2 (2 titles)

Evolution in the ATP ranking (singles) 
Changes in the ranking ATP to the end of the season.

Evolution in the ATP ranking (doubles) 
Changes in the ranking ATP to the end of the season.

Notes

External links
 
 
 

1992 births
Living people
French Open junior champions
People from Arequipa
Sportspeople from Lima
Peruvian male tennis players
Tennis players at the 2010 Summer Youth Olympics
US Open (tennis) junior champions
Tennis players at the 2011 Pan American Games
Pan American Games competitors for Peru
Grand Slam (tennis) champions in boys' doubles
Competitors at the 2010 South American Games
21st-century Peruvian people